Harley Street is a British television medical drama shown on ITV from 17 July to 21 August 2008.

The series was made by Carnival Films and was set in Harley Street, London. Created by Marston Bloom and written by Howard Overman, Jack Williams, and Nicole Taylor, the stories were about the lives of Harley Street specialists and the cases that were presented to them.

Cast
Paul Nicholls as Robert Fielding
Suranne Jones as Martha Eliot
Shaun Parkes as Ekkow Obiang
Oliver Dimsdale as Felix Quinn
Kim Medcalf as Annie Harke
Cush Jumbo as Hannah Fellows
Tom Ellis as Ross Jarvis
Rosie Day as Tess Elliot
Philip Jackson as Mal Fielding
Lucy Brown as Maya

Broadcasts
Harley Street was shown on ITV at 9pm each Thursday. The first transmission on 17 July had an audience of 3.9m and an 18% audience share. It was also the first drama ITV has aired in high definition on ITV HD available to Freesat viewers. The final episode was shown on 21 August.

On 19 November 2008, ITV announced that the programme would not return due to poor figures.

DVD release
Harley Street was released in the UK on 25 August 2008.

References

External links

2008 British television series debuts
2008 British television series endings
2000s British drama television series
ITV television dramas
2000s British television miniseries
2000s British medical television series
English-language television shows
Television shows set in London